David Charles Benton (born 29 October 1957) is a British nurse and regulatory and health policy expert who is the 5th Chief Executive Officer of the National Council of State Boards of Nursing (NCSBN) based in Chicago, Illinois, USA. Benton was previously Chief Executive Officer of the International Council of Nurses in Geneva, Switzerland. Benton publishes on nursing and health policy, leadership, occupational licensure and nurse regulatory models, workforce and migration, and research methods including the use of social network analysis, and bibliometric analysis.

Education
Benton is a Registered Nurse who qualified in both general nursing (1983) and mental health nursing (1984) at the Highland College of Nursing and Midwifery in Inverness which later became part of the University of Stirling. He was educated at Elgin East End School and Elgin Academy, Moray and holds a BSc in Electronic and Electrical Engineering (1978) from Robert Gordon Institute of Technology (now Robert Gordon University), an MPhil (1988) from Abertay University and an MSc and PhD (2013) from Complutense University of Madrid.

Professional life
Benton  started his nursing career working clinically in general medicine and then in acute psychiatric nursing in Inverness before moving  to a specialist post as District Research Nurse in 1988 to the then North East Essex Health Authority.

He then worked as the Chief Nurse and Director of Quality for the then Tower Hamlets Health Authority in London in 1990, Regional Nurse Director for the Northern and Yorkshire Regional Health Authority, Chief Executive Officer The National Board for Nursing, Midwifery and Health Visiting for Scotland (now NHS Education for Scotland) in 1998 during which time he represented all four of the National Boards on the group reviewing the future of the UK nursing regulatory model which ultimately resulted in the creation of the Nursing and Midwifery Council.

Benton became Director of Nursing of the then NHS Grampian Acute Hospitals Trust (2001) before moving to work for the International Council of Nurses (2005). He served as a special advisor to the Scottish Parliament’s workforce committee and served as a member of the then Health Minister’s committee for nursing on “Facing the Future”.  Benton was elected Chair of the Scottish Nurse Directors group from 2003 to 2005. Benton became Chief executive officer of the International Council of Nurses in 2008 before assuming his present position as 5th Chief Executive Officer of the National Council of State Boards of Nursing (NCSBN) in 2015.

Awards and recognition
Benton is a Fellow of the Florence Nightingale Foundation (2001) a Fellow of the Royal College of Nursing (2003) and a Fellow of the American Academy of Nursing (2007). He was a recipient of the inaugural Nursing Standard Leadership award (1993) and the Nuffield Traveling Fellowship for Research and Policy Studies in Health services (1999). In 2017, he received the Spanish Grand Nursing Cross: Gold Category, the highest award for nursing in relation to work on health policy and nursing regulation.

Personal life
Benton is married to Elizabeth Denise Benton (née Macrae) and they have three children.

Bibliography
Benton's publications are listed on Web of Science. His three most-cited articles are:

References

External links

Entry on Google Scholar

Living people
1957 births
Scottish nurses
British nurses
American nurses
Nursing researchers
Fellows of the American Academy of Nursing
Fellows of the Royal College of Nursing
Alumni of the University of Stirling
People educated at Elgin Academy, Moray